Estádio Adelmar da Costa Carvalho, commonly known as Estádio Ilha do Retiro, Ilha do Retiro or simply Ilha, is a football stadium situated in Recife, State of Pernambuco, in Northeastern Brazil, and owned by Sport Club do Recife.

The stadium's official name is Estádio Adelmar da Costa Carvalho, and it was inaugurated on July 4, 1937. The stadium's common name, Ilha do Retiro, is the name of the neighborhood where it is located. The stadium's official name, Adelmar da Costa Carvalho, is in honor of the Sport Club do Recife president who presided over the first major renovation of the stadium.

History 

Ilha do Retiro was the first stadium to be built in Recife, after Sport Recife bought a 17-hectare small ranch.

In the 1950 World Cup, the match between Chile and the United States was played at the stadium.

In 1987, fans watched Sport win a historical match against “paulista” side Guarani, that gave the Lion their first national trophy, the Campeonato Brasileiro of 1987, even though Flamengo claim to have won it too. The case went to the Supreme Federal Court and Sport won.

In 2008, the stadium was once again the stage of an epic match, this time at the final of the 2008 Copa do Brasil, against  Corinthians. They had lost the first leg on Parque São Jorge by 3x1, with the leonine goal being scored on the final moments of the match. Now playing in Recife, Sport managed to get a 2x0 win, and won on away goals. The victory was so unexpected, that Corinthians had signed a trophy afterparty before the match, only for the party to be cancelled later on.

Information 

 Official name: Estádio Adelmar da Costa Carvalho
 Capacity: 32,983 spectators
 Pitch Size: 105m x 78m
 Opened on July 4, 1937 (Sport-Santa Cruz 6–5)
 Record attendance: 56,875 spectators (Sport-Porto/PE 2–0, June 7, 1998, in Campeonato Pernambucano)
 Address: Avenida Sport Club do Recife, s/nº - Recife (PE)

References

External links
 Templos do Futebol
 Sport Recife's official website

Sports venues in Pernambuco
Ilha do Retiro
Ilha do Retiro
Sport Club do Recife